Denise Hayman (born January 1, 1951) is an American politician who has served in the Montana House of Representatives from the 66th district since 2015.

Prior to her legislative tenure, she spent fifteen years as a member of the Bozeman School Board.

References

1951 births
Living people
Democratic Party members of the Montana House of Representatives
21st-century American politicians
21st-century American women politicians
Women state legislators in Montana